The Southern Conference softball tournament (sometimes known simply as the SoCon Tournament) is the conference championship tournament in college softball for the Southern Conference (SoCon).  The winner receives the conference's automatic bid to the NCAA Division I softball tournament.

Tournament
All seven of the Conference's teams participate in the double-elimination tournament.  Chattanooga has won 15 championships, the most in the league's history.  Of schools currently sponsoring softball in the conference, Chattanooga, UNC Greensboro, Furman, Samford, and ETSU have won a tournament championship.

Champions

Year-by-year

By school

Italics indicate school no longer sponsors softball in the Southern Conference.

References